Edojobs is an initiative of the Edo State government in Nigeria under the administration of Governor Godwin Obaseki. The initiative is aimed at tackling the high rate of unemployment in Edo State through skills acquisition and empowerment programs, in collaboration with various private and public organizations in Edo State. The initiative was launched in 2016 as part of Obaseki's promise to create 200,000 new jobs for the region's youth.

Background
Based on 2011 statistics, Edo State has an unemployment rate of 35.2%. The program aims to ensure that residents of the State get filled into the various job openings in the state. EdoJobs is run by the Skills Development Programme of the Edo State Governor. It was headed by his Senior Special Adviser on skills development and Job Creation, Mrs. Ukinebo Dare until 2019 when the Agency was signed into law and Mrs. Ukinebo Dare was appointed as the Managing Director of the Agency. It is now officially known as Edo State Skills Development Agency but still popularly called Edojobs by citizens.

Programme
Some of the skills acquisition and empowerment programs offered by Edojobs includes:
 EdoInnovation Hub
 training/internship and job placement in Edo south
EdoProduction centre:A cluster for small and medium enterprise in Edo state
 EdoFood and Agriculture Cluster (Ehor, Uhumwonde local government area)
 Soap making training in Edo central
 Entrepreneurship training in Edo south
 Career kickstart program in Edo south
 EdoCreative Hub

Partnerships
The program partners with the following organizations:
 GIZ SKYE and GIZ SEDIN
 GenuisHub
 Amazon Web Services
 Poise Nigeria
 Gidijobs
 Sabihub Nigeria
Genius Hub
 Law Autos
 Mamamomi
 SLOT Academy 
 Interswitch 
 FirstBank Nigeria 
 Levantar Soap Factory

Impact 

The National Bureau of Statistics in 2020 released a report that showed Edo State having the lowest unemployment rate in the South South of Nigeria. Also while there was a rise in unemployment in Nigeria, Edo State witnessed a drop in unemployment.

References

External links 
 Edojobs official website External links

Edo State
Labour in Nigeria